John King guided Tranmere Rovers F.C to Leyland DAF Cup victory in 1989–90. Tranmere moved to the top of the Third Division after winning seven of their opening nine games, including a 6–0 victory over Bristol City. They also took Tottenham Hotspur to a Littlewoods Cup fourth round replay. Following a poor spell, they revived their promotion prospects with nine straight wins. Tranmere finished in fourth place, but lost 2–0 to Notts County in the play-off final. They defeated Rochdale 1–0, Scunthorpe United 2–1, Chester City 3–0, Bolton Wanderers 2–1 and Doncaster Rovers 3–1 in the Leyland DAF Cup before beating Bristol Rovers 2–1 in the final at Wembley Stadium.

Final league table

References 

 

 

Tranmere Rovers F.C. seasons
Tranmere Rovers